Giorgi Kokhreidze (born 18 November 1998) is a Georgian professional footballer who plays as a winger.

Club career
In July 2021, Kokhreidze joined Grenoble in French Ligue 2. On 6 January 2023, his contract with Grenoble was terminated by mutual consent.

References

External links
 
 Erovnuli Liga Player Profile

1998 births
Living people
Footballers from Georgia (country)
Georgia (country) youth international footballers
Georgia (country) under-21 international footballers
Association football midfielders
FC Saburtalo Tbilisi players
Grenoble Foot 38 players
Erovnuli Liga players
Ligue 2 players
Expatriate footballers from Georgia (country)
Expatriate footballers in France
Expatriate sportspeople from Georgia (country) in France